Barry Cotter is the name of:

Barry Cotter (footballer)
Barry Cotter (judge)